Statistics of Empress's Cup in the 2010 season.

Overview
It was contested by 32 teams, and INAC Kobe Leonessa won the championship.

Results

1st round
Je Vrille Kagoshima 1-0 Fukui University of Technology Fukui High School
AC Nagano Parceiro 2-3 Fujieda Junshin High School
Renaissance Kumamoto FC 0-3 Nippon TV Menina
Seiwa Gakuen High School 1-2 Shizuoka Sangyo University
Nippon Sport Science University 4-2 Bunnys Kyoto SC
Musashigaoka College 2-4 Speranza FC Takatsuki
Ehime Women's College 0-6 JFA Academy Fukushima
Aguilas Kobe 0-2 Kamimura Gakuen High School

2nd round
Tokiwagi Gakuken High School 6-0 Je Vrille Kagoshima
Fujieda Junshin High School 1-1 (pen 4-2) AS Elfen Sayama FC
Osaka University of Health and Sport Sciences 1-2 Nippon TV Menina
Shizuoka Sangyo University 2-0 Norddea Hokkaido
Hokkaido Bunkyo University Meisei High School 0-1 Nippon Sport Science University
Speranza FC Takatsuki 2-2 (pen 4-5) Kibi International University
Iga FC Kunoichi 2-0 JFA Academy Fukushima
Kamimura Gakuen High School 4-3 Shimizudaihachi Pleiades

3rd round
Nippon TV Beleza 0-0 (pen 4-5) Tokiwagi Gakuken High School
Fujieda Junshin High School 2-2 (pen 6-5) Fukuoka J. Anclas
Okayama Yunogo Belle 2-1 Nippon TV Menina
Shizuoka Sangyo University 0-6 INAC Kobe Leonessa
TEPCO Mareeze 5-0 Nippon Sport Science University
Kibi International University 0-4 Albirex Niigata
JEF United Chiba 2-1 Iga FC Kunoichi
Kamimura Gakuen High School 0-6 Urawa Reds

Quarterfinals
Tokiwagi Gakuken High School 2-0 Fujieda Junshin High School
Okayama Yunogo Belle 2-3 INAC Kobe Leonessa
TEPCO Mareeze 2-3 Albirex Niigata
JEF United Chiba 0-1 Urawa Reds

Semifinals
Tokiwagi Gakuken High School 0-5 INAC Kobe Leonessa
Albirex Niigata 1-3 Urawa Reds

Final
INAC Kobe Leonessa 1-1 (pen 3-2) Urawa Reds
INAC Kobe Leonessa won the championship.

References

Empress's Cup
2010 in Japanese women's football